Andrew Verner (born November 20, 1972) is a Canadian retired ice hockey goaltender. He most recently played for Sheffield Steelers, in the UK's Elite Ice Hockey League.

Playing career
Verner was born in York, Ontario. He played junior hockey in the Ontario Hockey League for the Peterborough Petes. He was drafted 34th overall by the Edmonton Oilers in the 1991 NHL Entry Draft, but spent three seasons playing in the American Hockey League for the Cape Breton Oilers and never managed to play in the NHL.

Since 1995, Verner has played in European leagues, beginning with a spell in Austria for EHC Lustenau, followed by a season in Finland's SM-liiga with HPK where he served as the team's starting goalie. He then spent two seasons in Sweden playing in the Elitserien with Malmö IF. He moved to the Deutsche Eishockey Liga in Germany, spending two seasons with the Kölner Haie and two seasons with the Hannover Scorpions. He returned to Austria to play for EC KAC in 2003 and stayed with the team until 2008 where he joined the Newcastle Vipers in the United Kingdom.

He spent the 08/09 season playing for the Newcastle Vipers in the UK's Elite Ice Hockey League. At the end of that season he was made a free agent before signing for Sheffield Steelers in October '09 as a replacement for injured goalie Kevin Reiter. In 2010, Verner retired after playing 17 professional seasons.

On May 2, 2012, The Peterborough Petes hired Andrew as their new full-time goaltending coach taking over for Ron Tugnutt who is stepping aside as the team's goaltending consultant after two seasons.

On August 21, 2014, The Peterborough Petes named Andrew as an Assistant Coach serving under Head Coach Jody Hull. On January 5, 2018, Andrew Verner was named the interim head coach of the Ontario Hockey Leagues Peterborough Petes.

References

External links

1972 births
Canadian ice hockey goaltenders
Cape Breton Oilers players
Edmonton Oilers draft picks
EHC Lustenau players
Hannover Scorpions players
HPK players
Ice hockey people from Toronto
EC KAC players
Kölner Haie players
Living people
Malmö Redhawks players
Newcastle Vipers players
People from Weston, Toronto
People from York, Toronto
Peterborough Petes (ice hockey) players
Canadian expatriate ice hockey players in England
Canadian expatriate ice hockey players in Austria
Canadian expatriate ice hockey players in Finland
Canadian expatriate ice hockey players in Germany
Canadian expatriate ice hockey players in Sweden